The Greater Manchester Combined Authority (GMCA) is a combined authority for Greater Manchester, England. It was established on 1 April 2011 and consists of 11 members; 10 indirectly elected members, each a directly elected councillor from one of the ten metropolitan boroughs that comprise Greater Manchester, together with the directly elected Mayor of Greater Manchester. The authority derives most of its powers from the Local Government Act 2000 and Local Democracy, Economic Development and Construction Act 2009, and replaced a range of single-purpose joint boards and quangos to provide a formal administrative authority for Greater Manchester for the first time since the abolition of Greater Manchester County Council in 1986.

The planning policies of the GMCA were developed in the 2000s by the Association of Greater Manchester Authorities in the Greater Manchester Strategy. It is a strategic authority with powers over public transport, skills, housing, regeneration, waste management, carbon neutrality and planning permission. Functional executive bodies, such as Transport for Greater Manchester, are responsible for delivery of services in these areas. The GMCA appoints a Chair and Vice-Chairs, from among its ten executive members.

The costs of the GMCA that are reasonably attributable to the exercise of its functions relating to public transport, economic development and regeneration (and any start up costs) are met by its constituent councils. Such costs are funded by direct government grant and, as a precepting authority, with some money collected with local Council Tax apportioned between the constituent councils.

History

Background

Greater Manchester was created as a metropolitan county composed of ten metropolitan boroughs on 1 April 1974 as a result of the Local Government Act 1972. From its investiture through to 31 March 1986, the county had a two-tier system of local government; district councils shared power with Greater Manchester County Council. The county council was abolished in 1986 as a result of the Local Government Act 1985, effectively making the 10 metropolitan boroughs unitary authority areas. The Association of Greater Manchester Authorities (AGMA) was established in 1986 as a voluntary association to make representations and bids on behalf of Greater Manchester and continue to manage strategic public services that were delegated to it by the councils, such as public transport and waste management. In the late-2000s, AGMA began actively seeking a formal government structure for Greater Manchester under the appellation "Manchester City Region".

Development and formation
Following a bid from AGMA highlighting the potential benefits in combatting the financial crisis of 2007–2008, it was announced in the 2009 United Kingdom Budget that Greater Manchester and the Leeds City Region would be awarded Statutory City Region Pilot status, allowing (if they desired) for their constituent district councils to pool resources and become statutory combined authorities with powers comparable to the Greater London Authority. The aim of the pilot was to evaluate the contributions to economic growth and sustainable development by combined authorities. The Local Democracy, Economic Development and Construction Act 2009, passed with reference to the 2009 United Kingdom Budget, enabled the creation of a combined authority for Greater Manchester with devolved powers on public transport, skills, housing, regeneration, waste management, carbon neutrality and planning permission, pending approval from the 10 councils. 

Between late-2009 and February 2010, AGMA debated the constitution and functions of the new combined authority, including matters such as name, voting system and remit. From February 2010 through to April 2010, the 10 metropolitan district councils were consulted for their recommendations before submission of their constitution to central government; changes included extra powers for controlling further education, additional provisions for scrutinising the authority, and swapping the draft name 'Manchester City Region Authority' (MCRA) for the 'Greater Manchester Combined Authority' (GMCA), a name approved by the Executive Board of AGMA.

Consultations made with district councils in March 2010 recommended that all GMCA matters requiring a vote would be decided on via a majority rule system involving 10 members appointed from among the councillors of the 10 metropolitan boroughs (one representing each borough of Greater Manchester with each council also nominating one substitute) without the input of the UK's central government. The Transport for Greater Manchester Committee would be formed from a pool of 33 councillors allocated by council population, roughly one councillor for every 75,000 residents to scrutinise the running of the Transport for Greater Manchester Committee (Manchester has five councillors, Wigan and Stockport four, Bury two and all other Boroughs three). The 10 district councils of Greater Manchester approved the creation of the GMCA on 29 March 2010, and submitted its final recommendations for its constitution to the Department for Communities and Local Government and the Department for Transport. On 31 March 2010, the then Communities Secretary John Denham approved the constitution and launched a 15-week public consultation on the draft bill together with the approved constitution. The replacement of AGMA by the GMCA, was requested to take place from 1 April 2011.

On 16 November 2010, the Department for Communities and Local Government announced that it had accepted the combined authority proposal and that an order to establish the GMCA would be laid before Parliament. The Greater Manchester Combined Authority Order 2011, which formally established the combined authority, was made on 22 March 2011 and came into force on 1 April 2011.

Schemes and strategies

Localism Act 2011
Following the passage of the Localism Act 2011 on 15 November 2011, the Department for Communities and Local Government began negotiating with groups of local councils for tailored deals to be included in the 2012 United Kingdom budget. The GMCA sought provision for a further transfer of powers that would result in an additional delegation of authority from the UK's central government. This step-change would mean that, instead of the GMCA bidding for government funding on a project-by-project basis, it will receive a sum of money from government ministers and would be able to determine, locally, how it is used. The UK Government is considering a further plan to allow passenger transport executives to raise local rail fares in their areas, and directly invest the money raised in infrastructure and rolling stock alongside the specification of additional or improved rail services.

Greater Manchester City Deal
A "City Deal" for Greater Manchester was announced in March 2012 by the then Deputy Prime Minister Nick Clegg and Cities Minister Greg Clark. The deal included:

 A "Revolving Infrastructure Fund" allowing the GMCA to earn-back up to £30 million per year against spending on infrastructure projects.
The formation of a "Greater Manchester Investment Framework" allowing Greater Manchester to make better use of Central Government and EU funding.
The establishment of a "Greater Manchester Housing Investment Board" to build new housing in the area.
The creation of a "City Apprenticeship and Skills Hub" to increase the number of apprenticeships available in the area.
The formation of a "Low Carbon Hub" to integrate multiple carbon reduction measures.

Reduced carbon and economic growth
In November 2012, the then Energy and Climate Change Secretary Edward Davey MP, signed an agreement between the GMCA and the Department of Energy and Climate Change, in recognition of its deliverance of low carbon initiatives (such as bulk-buying energy from suppliers for consumers in Greater Manchester), and committing the Government to design and deliver new green initiatives in Greater Manchester releasing millions in funding to pioneer new low carbon technologies.

The GMCA was praised in November 2012 as a model for other city regions by Sir Howard Bernstein and Michael Heseltine, for its economic benefits.

Planning and housing
The GMCA is producing the Greater Manchester Spatial Framework (GMSF), a joint strategic plan for Greater Manchester including land allocation for housing and other development. The initial GMSF was published in 2016 and a revised version was published in 2019. A further consultation took place in late 2020. The plan includes proposals for building on some green belt areas. Stockport Council withdrew from the GMSF in December 2020, and the replacement plan will be known as Places for Everyone.

The GMCA also established a housebuilder, Hive Homes, with local housing associations.

Transport
In May 2012, the GMCA proposed to set up a franchisor body with neighbouring metropolitan authorities in West Yorkshire and South Yorkshire, to take over the Northern and TransPennine Express rail franchises, and, from 2014/15, operate their routes under a single franchise, sharing financial risk and operational responsibilities.

The GMCA lobbied the government for two stations in Manchester on the proposed High Speed 2 railway from London; at Manchester Piccadilly and Manchester Airport.

Mayor of Greater Manchester
In November 2014, it was announced that Greater Manchester, along with several other city regions, would elect a 'metro-mayor' with similar powers to the Mayor of London. In May 2015 an interim mayor was appointed by GMCA: there were two candidates for this post; Peter Smith, leader of Wigan Borough Council and incumbent chairman of the Greater Manchester Combined Authority and Tony Lloyd, the Greater Manchester Police and Crime Commissioner. Tony Lloyd was selected to be interim mayor on 29 May 2015. The first Greater Manchester mayoral election was held on 4 May 2017. Andy Burnham was elected as the inaugural Mayor of Greater Manchester.

Organisation

Greater Manchester Combined Authority
The GMCA is made up of 11 constituent members - the Mayor of Greater Manchester together with one councillor appointed by each of Greater Manchester's 10 local authorities. Each member has one vote and each council also appoints one substitute member in the case of absence. The appointing council may at any time terminate the membership of its appointee, and the appointee will also cease to be a member if they cease to be an elected representative. The Mayor is the GMCA's chairperson, and a member of the second and third largest political groups on the authority, if applicable, are automatically appointed as vice-chairs.

Most questions arising before the GMCA are decided by a simple majority vote, and if a vote is tied it is considered to be lost. The chairperson does not have a casting vote. However, several subjects require an enhanced majority of eight votes in favour. These are:

 The adoption of a sustainable community strategy (known as the Greater Manchester Strategy), 
 Approval of new schemes to be financed by the Greater Manchester Transport Fund
 The approval of the local economic assessment
 The GMCA's annual budget
 The approval of borrowing limits, the treasury management strategy, the investment strategy and the capital budget
 The setting of the transport levy
 The acceptance of any proposed delegation of functions and budgets to the GMCA
 The amendment of the GMCA's rules of procedure
 The approval of the mayor's transport policy
 The approval of the mayor's local transport plan
 Such other plans and strategies as are determined by the GMCA

Any question relating to road user charging require a unanimous vote in favour by all 11 members.

Transport for Greater Manchester
Transport for Greater Manchester (TfGM) is the executive body of the GMCA for the execution of transport functions and is the executive agency responsible for the running of Greater Manchester's transport services and infrastructure such as Metrolink, subsidised bus and rail services as well as carrying out transport and environmental planning. The organisation carries out the previous functions of the Greater Manchester Passenger Transport Executive (GMPTE). The organisation absorbed the previously separate ITA Policy Unit, the GM Joint Transport Unit, the GMTU and GMUTC. It is supervised by the members of the Greater Manchester Transport Committee.

Greater Manchester Transport Committee
The Greater Manchester Transport Committee and its sub committees are formed from a nominated pool of 17 councillors from across the combined authority area to oversee TfGM and create transport policy on behalf of the GMCA. The GM Transport Committee is a joint committee of the 10 Greater Manchester local authorities and the GMCA, to which the GMCA, Mayor of Greater Manchester and the local authorities have referred or delegated most, or all, of their transport functions.

The functions which are referred (rather than delegated) to the committee, meaning that the final decision rests with the GMCA or the mayor rather than with the committee, include making recommendations in relation to promoting or opposing a private bill in Parliament and policy reviews and development on specific issues on the direction of the GMCA or the mayor.

Joint Overview and Scrutiny Committee
A Joint Overview and Scrutiny Committee (JOSC) provides scrutiny of the GMCA, TfGMC, TfGM and CNE, each constituent council appoints three of its elected members to JOSC and sub committees can be formed to examine specific issues.

Commissions

In anticipation of the combined authority, seven commissions were set up to handle the new responsibilities, six commenced operation between May and August 2009 they are:
 Commission For the New Economy (CNE)
 Planning and Housing Commission
 Transport Commission (never activated and superseded by the Transport for Greater Manchester Committee)
 Environment Commission
 Health Commission
 Public Protection Commission
 Improvement and Efficiency Commission

The current intention is that each of the Commissions (except Improvement and Efficiency which consist entirely of local authority members) are formed of a mixture of elected members and representatives from other partners, including the private sector, other public sector agencies and the voluntary sector. Seats are shared out amongst all the local authorities as equally as possible, with no local authority having more than one seat on each Commission with the exception of the Improvement and Efficiency Commission which will have all authorities represented. Each Commission's decisions require approval by the members of the GMCA.

Partner bodies
A partnership board has been established consisting of members of the GMCA, the Chair of TfGMC and senior members of neighbouring authorities to discuss matters of common interest.

Cabinet
The GMCA is made up of 11 constituent members: the elected Mayor of Greater Manchester and 10 members who are elected councillors, nominated by each of Greater Manchester's constituent authorities. The mayor is also supported by a non-constituent Deputy Mayor for Policing and Crime – the only salaried portfolio holder. Between 2018 and 2020, Lord Smith of Leigh continued in his lead role for Health after retiring from his leadership of Wigan Council. In most cases, the council's nominee is the leader of the authority, although there is no requirement for them to be so.

{| class="wikitable" style="font-size:90%"
|-
! Nominating authority
! colspan = 2 | 2011
! colspan = 2 | 2012
! colspan = 2 | 2013
! colspan = 2 | 2014
! colspan = 2 | 2015
! colspan = 2 | 2016
! colspan = 2 | 2017
! colspan = 2 | 2018
! colspan = 2 | 2019
! colspan = 2 | 2020
! colspan = 2 | May 2021
! colspan = 2 | July 2021
! colspan = 2 | August 2021
! colspan = 2 | December 2021
! colspan = 2 | 2022
! colspan = 2 | 2023
! Position within nominating authority
! Portfolio within combined authority
|-
! rowspan = 2 | Greater Manchester Combined Authority
| width=1px style="background-color: #FFFFFF" |
| colspan = 7 | Office not yet established
| width=1px style="background-color: " |
| colspan = 3 | Tony Lloyd (Interim)
| width=1px style="background-color: " |
| colspan = 19 |  Andy Burnham
| Mayor of Greater Manchester
| Policy & Reform, Transport
|-
| width=1px style="background-color: #FFFFFF" |
| colspan = 11 | Office not yet established
| width=1px style="background-color: " |
| colspan = 17 |  The Baroness Hughes of Stretford 
| width=1px style="background-color: " |
| colspan = 1 | Kate Green 
| Deputy Mayorfor Policing, Crime, Criminal Justice & Fire
| Safer, Stronger Communities
|-
! Bolton Metropolitan Borough Council
| width=1px style="background-color: " |
| colspan = 13 | Clifford Morris
| width=1px style="background-color: " |
| Linda Thomas
| width=1px style="background-color: " |
| colspan = 5 | David Greenhalgh
| width=1px style="background-color: #FFFFFF" |
| colspan = 1 | vacant
| width=1px style="background-color: " |
| colspan = 7 | Martyn Cox
| Leader
| Green City Region and Waste
|-
! Bury Metropolitan Borough Council
| width=1px style="background-color: " |
| colspan = 9 | Mike Connolly
| width=1px style="background-color: " |
| colspan = 7 | Rishi Shori
| width=1px style="background-color: " |
| colspan = 13 | Eamonn O'Brien
| Leader
| Education, Skills, Work, Apprenticeships and Digital
|-
! Manchester City Council
| width=1px style="background-color: " |
| colspan = 25 | Sir Richard Leese | width=1px style="background-color: " |
| colspan = 5 | Bev Craig| Leader
| Economy, Business and International
|-
! Oldham Metropolitan Borough Council
| width=1px style="background-color: " |
| colspan = 9 | Jim McMahon 
| width=1px style="background-color: " |
| colspan= 3 | Jean Stretton
| width=1px style="background-color: " |
| colspan= 5 | Sean Fielding
| width=1px style="background-color: " |
| colspan= 7 | Arooj Shah
| width=1px style="background-color: " |
| colspan= 3 | Amanda Chadderton| Leader
| Equalities, Inclusion and Cohesion
|-
! Rochdale Metropolitan Borough Council
| width=1px style="background-color: " |
| colspan = 5 | Colin Lambert
| width=1px style="background-color: " |
| colspan = 5 | Richard Farnell
| width=1px style="background-color: " |
| colspan = 7 | Allen Brett
| width=1px style="background-color: " |
| colspan = 11 | Neil Emmott| Leader
| Culture
|-
! Salford City Council
| width=1px style="background-color: " |
| colspan = 1 | John Merry
| width=1px style="background-color: " |
| colspan = 7 | Ian Stewart
| width=1px style="background-color: " |
| colspan = 21 | Paul Dennett| Mayor
| Deputy Mayor; Homelessness, Healthy Lives and Quality Care
|-
! Stockport Metropolitan Borough Council
| width=1px style="background-color: " |
| colspan = 1 | Dave Goddard
| width=1px style="background-color: " |
| colspan = 7 | Sue Derbyshire
| width=1px style="background-color: " |
| colspan = 5 | Alex Ganotis
| width=1px style="background-color: " |
| colspan = 11 | Elise Wilson
| width=1px style="background-color: " |
| colspan = 3 | Mark Hunter| Leader
| Young People
|-
! Tameside Metropolitan Borough Council
| width=1px style="background-color: " |
| colspan = 13 | Kieran Quinn
| width=1px style="background-color: " |
| colspan = 13 | Brenda Warrington
| width=1px style="background-color: " |
| colspan = 3 | Gerald Cooney| Leader
| Communities and Co-operatives
|-
! Trafford Metropolitan Borough Council
| width=1px style="background-color: " |
| colspan = 5 | Matthew Colledge
| width=1px style="background-color: " |
| colspan = 7 | Sean Anstee
| width=1px style="background-color: " |
| colspan = 15 | Andrew Western| width=1px style="background-color: " |
| colspan = 1 | Tom Ross| Leader
| TBC
|-
! Wigan Metropolitan Borough Council
| width=1px style="background-color: " |
| colspan = 13 |  The Lord Smith of Leigh
| width=1px style="background-color: " |
| colspan= 17 | David Molyneux| Leader
| Resources and Investment
|}Colour key (for political parties): 

Current office holders are highlighted in bold'''.

References

External links
 Greater Manchester Combined Authority
 Transport for Greater Manchester
 Transport for Greater Manchester Committee
 Commission for the New Economy
 Greater Manchester Health Commission

Local government in Greater Manchester
2011 establishments in England
Local authorities in Greater Manchester
Combined authorities